Cengkang-Batu Ceper-Kunciran Toll Road is a toll road, which runs from Cengkareng to Kunciran in Greater Jakarta, Indonesia. This toll road is part of the Jakarta Outer Ring Road 2 network that will connect Soekarno-Hatta International Airport to Cilincing. The toll road will be connected to the Jakarta-Tangerang Toll Road,  Kunciran-Serpong Toll Road, as well as Prof. Dr. Ir. Soedijatmo Toll Road.

History
Cengkareng-Batu Ceper-Kunciran is 14.19 kilometers long, consisting of 4 work sections. The four sections are, section 1 Kunciran – IC of Sultan Ageng Tirtayasa for 2.04 km, section 2 IC of Sultan Ageng Tirtayasa – on / off ramp of Benteng Betawi along 3.50 km. Then section 3 is the on / off ramp of Benteng Betawi – IC Husein Sastranegara along 6.50 km, and section 4 IC Husein Sastranegara – Benda Junction along 2.15 km. The toll road was expected to be operational by 2019. The toll road was inaugurated in 1 April 2019 along with the first section of Serpong–Cinere Toll Road.

Toll gates

See also

Trans-Java toll road

References

Buildings and structures in Jakarta
Toll roads in Indonesia
Transport in Jakarta
Transport in Banten